Epinotia nisella is a moth of the family Tortricidae which is found in the Palearctic, Europe and North America. It was first described be Carl Alexander Clerck in 1759.

Life cycle
The wingspan is about 12–17 mm.The forewings are grey, more or less mixed with white, slightly ferruginous-tinged, irregularly strigulated with blackish-grey . The basal patch is darker, it's edge more blackish and acutely angulated in the middle. There often is a ferruginous or red-brown flattened-triangular dorsal blotch distal to this. The central fascia is slender, irregular, again somewhat darker. The edges of the ocellus, and sometimes a stria above them leaden-metallic. Sometimes the whole forewing is suffused with ferruginous except the basal and terminal patches ; termen sinuate. The hindwings are light fuscous, terminally dark fuscous.The larva is pale green ; head dark brown 

Adults are on wing in July and August and during the day can be found on the foliage or amongst lichen on the tree trunks of the larval foodplants. When disturbed it flies erratically to another resting place and in the evening comes to light.
.

Ova
Eggs are laid on poplars (Populus species) and willows (Salix species), especially rough-leaved species. They include aspen (P. tremula), black poplar (P. nigra), grey poplar (Populus × canescens), grey willow (S. cinerea) and goat willow (S. caprea).

Larva
The larvae feed from April to June on the catkins or between a sandwich of two leaves.

Pupa
Pupae are light brown and can be found in the larval habitation or in a flimsy, brownish, silken cocoon amongst leaf litter in June and July. Tort book

Distribution
It is found in most of Europe (except Iceland, Portugal, Ukraine, and the central part of the Balkan Peninsula), east to the Near East and the eastern part of the Palearctic realm. It is also found in North America, including Massachusetts and Minnesota in the United States. In Canada, it is found from Newfoundland to British Columbia.

Notes

References

External links
 Fauna Europaea
 mothphotographersgroup
 Bug Guide
 Tortricid.net

Eucosmini
Moths described in 1759
Moths of Asia
Tortricidae of Europe
Moths of North America
Taxa named by Carl Alexander Clerck